Marquardt is a surname of German origin. Notable people with the surname include:
August F. Marquardt (1850–1925), American politician
Bridget Marquardt (born 1973), American television personality, glamour model, and actress
Christel Marquardt, judge on the Kansas Court of Appeals
Christiane Marquardt (born 1958), retired East German sprinter
Darcy Marquardt (born 1979), Canadian rower
David Marquardt, co-founder of venture capital firm August Capital
Donald Marquardt (1929–1997), American statistician
Elizabeth Marquardt, author of Between Two Worlds: The Inner Lives of Children of Divorce
Joachim Marquardt (1812–1882), German historian and writer on Roman antiquities
Lewis Marquardt (1936-2010), American politician and educator
Markus Marquardt (born 1970), German operatic baritone
Mike Marquardt (born 1982), American football defensive tackle
Nate Marquardt (born 1979), American mixed martial artist
Patrick Marquardt (born 1979), Swedish music producer and artist AKA Nomy
Ollie Marquardt (1902–1968), infielder in Major League Baseball
R. Niels Marquardt (born 1953), American diplomat
Roy Edward Marquardt (1917–1982), American engineer, inventor of the ramjet, founder of Marquardt Aircraft Co.
Stephen R. Marquardt, American surgeon

Companies and enterprises:
Marquardt Aircraft, see Marquardt Corporation
Marquardt Group, a manufacturing company of electromechanical and electronic switches
Marquardt Corporation, an aeronautical engineering firm

Other:
Marquardt, a neighbourhood of Potsdam, Germany
Marquardt station, its railway station
Schloss Marquardt, a castle in this neighbourhood

See also
Marquardt Slevogt (1909–1980), German ice hockey player

Marquard (disambiguation)
Marquart